Jyske Bank Boxen is an indoor arena, located in Herning, Denmark, that is part of the Messecenter Herning. Opened in October 2010, it has a maximum capacity of 12,500.

It hosts concerts, ice hockey, basketball, volleyball, team handball and gymnastics competitions. It has hosted the 2010 European Women's Handball Championships, the 2013 European Short Course Swimming Championships, the 2014 European Men's Handball Championship, the 2019 World Men's Handball Championship and the 2020 European Women's Handball Championship. It will host the 2025 World Men's Handball Championship.

History
On 1 October 2010, Danish financial institution Jyske Bank purchased naming rights to the arena.

The arena's opening event, on 20 October 2010, was a concert by Lady Gaga, during The Monster Ball Tour, with Semi Precious Weapons as her opening act.

The arena was also being considered as the venue for the Eurovision Song Contest 2014, before the contract was eventually won by B&W Hallerne, Refshaleøen in Copenhagen.

The arena was one of two arenas to host the 2018 IIHF World Championship, the other being the Royal Arena in Copenhagen.

Concerts

See also
List of indoor arenas in Denmark
List of indoor arenas in Nordic countries

References

External links

 

Indoor arenas in Denmark
Buildings and structures in Herning Municipality
Sports venues completed in 2010
Basketball venues in Denmark
Volleyball venues in Denmark
2010 establishments in Denmark
Herning